Le Père Noël a les yeux bleus (1966) is a fifty-minute film starring French nouvelle vague icon Jean-Pierre Léaud, whose character takes on a job dressing up as Santa Claus in order to save money for a stylish duffel coat. It was the second commercial film made by French director Jean Eustache, who would go on to make several other featurettes.

The title translates as Santa Claus Has Blue Eyes.

External links

French black-and-white films
1966 films
Films directed by Jean Eustache
1960s French films
Santa Claus in film